Jean-Baptiste Biaggi (27 August 1917 – 29 July 2009) was a French politician.

Biaggi was born in Ponce, Puerto Rico, on 27 August 1917. He attended Lycée de Bastia, and  before graduating from Faculty of Law of Paris. During World War II, Biaggi was a member of the French Resistance. His actions during the conflict were honored with the Escapees' Medal and Resistance Medal. He was also a knight of the Legion of Honour.

Following the war, Biaggi served on the National Assembly from 1958 to 1962. He was elected from Paris's 14th constituency in Seine department and affiliated with the Union for the New Republic. Between 1959 and 1961, Biaggi sat on the Senate, as a representative of the National Assembly. After stepping down from the French Parliament, Biaggi was mayor of Cagnano from 1965 to 1983.

References

1917 births
2009 deaths
French Senators of the Fifth Republic
French senators elected by the National Assembly
Deputies of the 1st National Assembly of the French Fifth Republic
People from Ponce, Puerto Rico
Union for the New Republic politicians
Recipients of the Resistance Medal
French prisoners of war in World War II
Chevaliers of the Légion d'honneur
Mayors of places in Corsica
Puerto Rican emigrants
Immigrants to France